William Russell Arrington (July 4, 1906 – October 3, 1979) was an American politician and lawyer.

Born in Gillespie, Illinois, Arrington graduated from University of Illinois and from the University of Illinois College of Law. He was admitted to the Illinois bar and practiced law in Evanston, Illinois. He was a Republican. From 1945 to 1953, Arrington served in the Illinois House of Representatives. Then from 1955 to 1973, Arrington served in the Illinois State Senate. Arrington died at his home in Evanston, Illinois.

Notes

1906 births
1979 deaths
People from Evanston, Illinois
People from Gillespie, Illinois
University of Illinois College of Law alumni
Illinois lawyers
Republican Party members of the Illinois House of Representatives
Republican Party Illinois state senators
20th-century American politicians
20th-century American lawyers